Pot Luck with Elvis is the seventh studio album by American singer and musician Elvis Presley, released on RCA Victor in mono and stereo, LPM/LSP 2523, in 	May 18, 1962. Recording sessions took place on March 22, 1961, at Radio Recorders in Hollywood, and on June 25 and October 15, 1961, and March 18 and March 19, 1962, at RCA Studio B in Nashville, Tennessee. It peaked at number 4 on the Billboard Top LP's chart.

Content
The album is dominated by the songwriting team of Doc Pomus and Mort Shuman, who had written the chart-topping "Surrender" and the double-sided hit single "(Marie's the Name) His Latest Flame" backed with "Little Sister". The tracks "Kiss Me Quick" and "Suspicion" would be pulled off for a Top 40 single almost two years later in April 1964, following a hit cover version of the latter song by Terry Stafford (an Elvis sound alike). The rest of the tracks originated from regular Presley contributors such as Don Robertson, Otis Blackwell, and Paul Evans, with Blackwell's "(Such an) Easy Question" also being used as a single release in June 1965 and climbing to #1 and  #11 on, respectively,  the Billboard Adult Contemporary and  Hot 100 charts, during a time when Presley was involved mostly in feature film and soundtrack work.

"That's Someone You Never Forget", with concept and title by Presley, was written in conjunction with Red West and possibly in memory of Elvis' deceased mother, Gladys Presley. The song would later go to number 92 on the Billboard Hot 100 in May 1967 as the B-side to the single "Long Legged Girl (With the Short Dress On)". Another song from these sessions, "You'll Be Gone", written by Presley and West, this time with fellow "Memphis Mafia" cohort Charlie Hodge, would appear as the b-side to "Do the Clam". The song "Steppin' Out of Line" is an unused track from the sessions for Blue Hawaii.

Although like its predecessors in 1960 and 1961 – Elvis Is Back! and Something For Everybody, –  Pot Luck easily made the top ten on the album chart, all three had been vastly outsold by the soundtrack albums G.I. Blues and Blue Hawaii, a pattern that would continue to hold for Presley through the mid-1960s. The soundtracks had the advantage of the films as a promotional tool and Colonel Tom Parker went against standard practice in the American record industry by refusing to include hit singles on albums, which would have likely increased sales. As a result, Presley would concentrate on his movie career, and not make another non-soundtrack, non-gospel studio album for another seven years, until From Elvis in Memphis.

Reissues
The July 13, 1999, Compact Disc reissue altered the running order of the album, and included five bonus tracks in two sides of one single, one b-side, and two tracks from the 1965 compilation album LSP 3450, Elvis for Everyone. The three single sides had been recorded at the sessions that yielded the balance of the album on March 18 and 19, 1962. One single had both sides written by Jerry Leiber and Mike Stoller, while "You'll Be Gone" had been issued as a b-side in 1965. Given the nature of the Elvis for Everyone LP, compiled from sessions spanning a ten-year stretch, RCA opted not to include it as part of its reissue program, appending its songs as bonus tracks to other albums as appropriate. The bonus tracks were all recorded at Studio B in Nashville.

Pot Luck was reissued on the Follow That Dream label in 2007 in a deluxe 2-disc CD collection containing the original album along with numerous alternate takes from the original recording sessions.

Track listing

Original release

1999 reissue with bonus tracks

2007 Follow That Dream CD reissue

Note
*previously unreleased

Personnel

 Elvis Presley – lead vocals
 Scotty Moore – rhythm guitar
 Jerry Kennedy – lead guitar on "Night Rider"
 Hank Garland – lead guitar on "Kiss Me Quick", "I'm Yours" and "That's Someone You Never Forget"
 Tiny Timbrell – rhythm guitar on "Steppin' Out of Line"
 Harold Bradley – guitar
 Grady Martin – guitar, vibes
 Floyd Cramer – piano, organ
 Dudley Brooks – piano
 Gordon Stoker – piano
 Bob Moore – double bass
 D. J. Fontana – drums
 Buddy Harman – drums
 Millie Kirkham – backing vocals
 The Jordanaires – backing vocals
 Boots Randolph – saxophone

Charts

References
Notes

Sources

External links

LPM-2523 Pot Luck Guide part of The Elvis Presley Record Research Database
LSP-2523 Pot Luck Guide part of The Elvis Presley Record Research Database

Elvis Presley albums
1962 albums
Albums produced by Steve Sholes
RCA Victor albums